The 1925 West Virginia Mountaineers football team was an American football team that represented West Virginia University as an independent during the 1925 college football season. In its first season under head coach Ira Rodgers, the team compiled an 8–1 record, shut out seven of nine opponents, allowed only two touchdowns during the season, and outscored opponents by a total of 175 to 18.

The team played its home games at the newly-constructed Mountaineer Field in Morgantown, West Virginia. The dedication ceremony for the new stadium was conducted on November 14, 1925.

Guard Walter Mahan was selected as second-team All-Americans. Mahan was also the team captain.

Schedule

References

West Virginia
West Virginia Mountaineers football seasons
West Virginia Mountaineers football